Tanoso is a town in the Ashanti Region of Ghana. The town is known for the Yaa Asantewaa Girls Secondary School.  The school is a second cycle institution.

Education
Community Health Nurses' Training College (2003)

References

Populated places in the Ashanti Region